The Adventures of Rex and Rinty (1935) is a Mascot film serial directed by Ford Beebe and B. Reeves Eason and starring the equine actor Rex ("The King of Wild Horses") and canine actor Rin Tin Tin, Jr.

Cast
 Rex the king of wild horses as himself 
 Rin Tin Tin, Jr. as Rinty 
 Kane Richmond as Frank Bradley 
 Norma Taylor as Dorothy Bruce 
 Mischa Auer as Tanaga
 Smiley Burnette as Jensen 
 Harry Woods as Crawford 
 Pedro Regas as Pasha
 Hooper Atchley as Debor
 Wheeler Oakman as Henchman Wheeler 
 Victor Potel as Kinso, Royal Guard Commander
 Allan Cavan as Mr. Bruce

Additional crew
 Story: B. Reeves Easton, Maurice Geraghty, Ray Trampe
 Musical Director: Lee Zahler
 Supervising Editor: Joseph H. Lewis
 Sound Effects Editor: Roy Granville 
 Sound Engineer: Clifford A. Ruberg (as Cliff Ruberg)
 Stunts: Tracy Layne, Ted Mapes, Eddie Parker, Joe Yrigoyen (all uncredited)

Chapter titles
 God Horse of Sujan
 Sport of Kings
 Fangs of Flame
 Homewards Bound
 Babes in the Woods
 Dead Man's Tale
 End of the Road
 A Dog's Devotion
 The Stranger's Recall
 The Siren of Death
 New Gods for Old
 Primitive Justice
Source:

See also
 List of American films of 1935

References

External links

 

1935 films
1935 adventure films
American black-and-white films
1930s English-language films
Films about dogs
Films about horses
Mascot Pictures film serials
Films directed by B. Reeves Eason
Films directed by Ford Beebe
Articles containing video clips
Films produced by Nat Levine
American adventure films
Rin Tin Tin
1930s American films